Pârâul Pietros may refer to:

 Pârâul Pietros, a tributary of the Brădești in Harghita County
 Pârâul Pietros, a tributary of the Vâlcele in Covasna County
 Pârâul Pietros (Vișeu), a tributary of the Vișeu in Maramureș County